Malaba is a village in Ngounié Province, Gabon.

References

Populated places in Ngounié Province